HD 36960 (HR 1887) is a B-type main-sequence star in the constellation Orion. At an apparent magnitude of +4.78 it is easily visible to the naked eye in many areas, though in most urban areas it cannot be seen due to light pollution.  Although it does not have a Bayer or Flamsteed designation, it is brighter than over 30 Flamsteed stars in Orion, as well as being brighter than any of the stars in the nearby Orion Nebula such as θ1 Orionis C and θ2 Orionis.

HD 36960 forms a close pair with the slightly fainter HD 36959 36" away.  Multiple star catalogues also list the 9th magnitude BD-06°1233 as part of the system.  HD 36959 is itself a very close binary with a 9th magnitude companion.  All these stars are likely members of open cluster NGC 1980 which includes ι Orionis 7' away.

At over 15 solar masses, it shines with around 20,000 times the Sun's luminosity due to its high surface temperature of 29,000 K and radius over five times that of the sun.  It is calculated to be around six million years old, consistent with other stars thought to be members of NGC 1980.

References

Orion (constellation)
B-type main-sequence stars
036960
1887
Orionis, 103
026199
Durchmusterung objects